Eick may refer to:

 EICK, ICAO code for Cork Airport

People with the surname 
 Alfred Eick (1916–2015), German U-boat commander
 David Eick (born 1968), American film producer
 Mathias Eick (born 1979), Norwegian jazz musician

See also 
 Theodor Eicke (1892–1943), German SS functionary during the Nazi era
 Eicks, a village in Mechernich, North Rhine-Westphalia, Germany
 Van Eyck (disambiguation)